Blue Print is an arcade maze game released in September 1982. It was developed by the Stamper brothers (of Zilec Electronics at the time) and licensed to Bally Midway. Ports of Blue Print were published by CBS Electronics for the  Atari 2600, Atari 5200, and Commodore 64 in 1983.

Gameplay
The player controls J.J., a man whose girlfriend Daisy is being chased by Ollie Ogre. To defeat Ollie, J.J. must find all the parts of a machine he has designed, assemble it, and use it to shoot Ollie. Controls consist of a joystick and a button.

The screen is divided into three sections. At the top is a ledge on which Ollie chases the girl, occasionally knocking down flowerpots that may hit J.J. The center portion is a maze of 10 houses. The bottom contains the machine's blueprint, a "start button", and a pit. Eight of the houses contain one machine part each, while the other two contain bombs; the contents of a house are only revealed when J.J. enters it. If a part is found, the player must move it into the proper position on the blueprint. If a bomb is found, the player must carry it to the pit before it explodes. The player will always find a bomb in any previously visited house. Holding the button down allows faster movement, but speed can be used only for a limited time as shown by an on-screen gauge. The gauge is partially refilled when setting a newly found part on the blueprint.

Once the machine is fully assembled, J.J. must step on the start button and then climb aboard the machine. The player must now use the joystick to maneuver left and right as it shoots balls upward. If Ollie is hit, he falls down and the level is complete, with bonus points awarded for each flowerpot remaining on the ledge. A new level then begins, with the houses in a different configuration. The first three levels are unique, but the fourth level and beyond use the same level layout.

J.J. must avoid falling flowerpots, bouncing flowers that emerge from the flowerpots, and a creature named Fuzzy Wuzzy who roams the maze (on the C64 version it is known as 'Maze Monster' and appears starting at level 2). A monster named Sneaky Pete (Weird Willie on the C64 version) occasionally climbs out of the pit and wanders across to the start button, stomping on it, which causes the parts of the machine to fall off of the blueprint. J.J. must drag Pete back to the pit and then set the fallen parts in place again.

References

External links 

Blue Print for the Atari 5200 at Atari Mania

1982 video games
Arcade video games
Atari 2600 games
Atari 5200 games
Commodore 64 games
Maze games
Midway video games
Video games developed in the United Kingdom